The Idaho Transportation Department (ITD) is the state of Idaho governmental organization responsible for state transportation infrastructure. This includes ongoing operations and maintenance as well as planning for future needs of the state and its citizens. The agency is responsible for overseeing the disbursement of federal, state, and grant funding for transportation programs in the state.

Overview

The agency is also responsible for 29 rest areas and 12 ports of entry.

History
The Idaho Legislature created the State Highway Commission  in 1913. The group consisted of the Secretary of State, the State Engineer and three other members to be appointed by the governor. The Commission was empowered to:
 plan, build and maintain new state highways
 alter, improve or discontinue any state highway
 purchase, condemn, or otherwise obtain necessary easements
 have general supervision of all highways within the state
 expend the fund created for the construction, maintenance and improvement of state highways
 maintain and improve state highways
 make and enforce rules
 employ a Chief Engineer and assistants
 supervise registration of vehicles
 keep a complete record of all activities and expenses

In 1919, the Commission was abolished and its functions were transferred to a Bureau of Highways in the Department of Public Works. A property tax was enacted by the Legislature to fund roads for the state and bonds were issued to build a highway system.

In 1950, the Idaho Department of Highways was reorganized and placed under the direction of a governing Board. In 1974, the Idaho Department of Highways became the Idaho Transportation Department. The Department of Motor Vehicles originally reported to the Idaho Department of Law Enforcement, but was transferred to ITD in 1982.

Organization

ITD is organized into six divisions and six district offices. The agency serves under an appointed seven member Idaho Transportation Board. The board establishes state transportation policy and guides the planning, development and management of the Idaho transportation network. The board is appointed by the governor. One board member represents each of the six regional districts. A seventh member is appointed as chairman of the board.

The department has the following six divisions:
 Administration
 Aeronautics 
 Highways 
 Human Resources
 Motor Vehicles  
 Transportation Performance

District offices

 District 1" Benewah, Bonner, Boundary, Kootenai, and Shoshone counties. Headquartered in Coeur d'Alene.
 District 2: Clearwater, Idaho, Latah, Lewis, and Nez Perce counties. Headquartered in Lewiston.
 District 3: Ada, Adams, Boise, Canyon, Elmore, Gem, Owyhee, Payette, Valley, and Washington counties. Headquartered in Boise.
 District 4: Blaine, Camas, Cassia, Gooding, Jerome, Lincoln, Minidoka, and Twin Falls counties. Headquartered in Shoshone.
 District 5: Bannock, Bear Lake, Bingham, Caribou, Franklin, Oneida, and Power counties. Headquartered in Pocatello.
 District 6: Bonneville, Butte, Clark, Custer, Fremont, Jefferson, Lemhi, Madison, and Teton counties. Headquartered in Rigby.

See also

 Vehicle registration plates of Idaho

References

External links

 

Government of Idaho
Transportation Department
State departments of transportation of the United States
Transportation in Idaho
Motor vehicle registration agencies
1974 establishments in Idaho